Canavalia is a genus of plants in the legume family (Fabaceae) that comprises approximately 48 to 50 species of tropical vines. Members of the genus are commonly known as jack-beans. The species of Canavalia endemic to the Hawaiian Islands were named āwikiwiki by the Native Hawaiians. The name translates to "the very quick one" and comes from the Hawaiian word for "fast". The genus name is derived from the Malabar word for the species, kavavali, which means "forest climber."

Uses
Several species are valued legume crops, including common jack-bean (C. ensiformis), sword bean (C. gladiata) and C. cathartica. At least the first makes a beneficial weed- and pathogen-suppressing living mulch. The common jack-bean is also a source of the lectin concanavalin A, which is used as a reagent in glycoprotein biochemistry and immunology. The jack-bean is also a common source of purified urease enzyme used in scientific research.

The bay bean (Canavalia rosea) is supposedly mildly psychoactive when smoked, and is used in tobacco substitutes.

Ecology
Some animals have adaptations to the defensive chemicals of jack-beans. Caterpillars such as that of the two-barred flasher (Astraptes fulgerator) are sometimes found on Canavalia. The plant pathogenic ascomycete fungus Mycosphaerella canavaliae was described from a jack-bean. Introduced herbivores have wreaked havoc on Canavalia on the Hawaiian Islands and made some nearly extinct; it may be that these lost their chemical defenses because no herbivorous mammals existed in their range until introduced by humans. The usually bright pea-flowers are pollinated by insects such as solitary bees and carpenter bees such as Xylocopa confusa.

History
The genus name Canavalia was, as recently as 1913, known as Canavali.

Diversity

Species include:

Canavalia acuminata Rose
Canavalia africana Dunn
Canavalia altipendula (Piper) Standl.
Canavalia aurita J.D. Sauer
Canavalia bicarinata Standl.
Canavalia boliviana Piper
Canavalia bonariensis Lindl.
Canavalia brasiliensis Mart. ex Benth. – Barbicou-bean, feijão-bravo do Ceará (Brazil)
Canavalia campylocarpa Piper
Canavalia cathartica Thouars (syn. C. virosa (Roxb.) Wight & Arn.)
Canavalia centralis H.St.John
Canavalia concinna J.D.Sauer
Canavalia dolichothyrsa G.P. Lewis
Canavalia dura J.D. Sauer
Canavalia ensiformis (L.) DC. – common jack-bean, giant stock-bean, gotani-bean, horse-bean, seaside-bean, wonder-bean, feijão-de-porco (Brazil)
Canavalia eurycarpa Piper
Canavalia forbesii H.St.John
Canavalia galeata (Gaudich.) Vogel (Oahu)
Canavalia glabra (M. Martens & Galeotti) J.D.Sauer
Canavalia gladiata (Jacq.) DC. – sword bean, scimitar-bean
Canavalia grandiflora Benth.
Canavalia haleakalaensis H.St.John
Canavalia hawaiiensis O.Deg., I.Deg. & J.D.Sauer
Canavalia hirsutissima J.D. Sauer
Canavalia iaoensis H.St.John
Canavalia kauaiensis J.D.Sauer
Canavalia kauensis H.St.John
Canavalia lineata (Thunb.) DC.
Canavalia macrobotrys Merr.
Canavalia macropleura Piper
Canavalia madagascariensis J.D.Sauer
Canavalia makahaensis H.St.John
Canavalia mattogrossensis (Barb. Rodr.) Malme
Canavalia matudae J.D. Sauer
Canavalia microsperma Urb.
Canavalia mollis Wight & Arn.
Canavalia molokaiensis O.Deg., I.Deg. & J.D.Sauer – Molokai jack-bean
Canavalia munroi (O.Deg. & I.Deg.) H.St.John
Canavalia napaliensis H.St.John – Mākaha Valley jack-bean
Canavalia nitida (Cav.) Piper – Cathie's bean
Canavalia nualoloensis H.St.John
Canavalia obidensis Ducke
Canavalia oxyphylla Standl. & L.O. Williams
Canavalia palmeri (Piper) Standl.
Canavalia papuana Merr. & L.M. Perry
Canavalia parviflora Benth.
Canavalia peninsularis H.St.John
Canavalia picta Benth.
Canavalia piperi Killip & J.F.Macbr.
Canavalia plagiosperma Piper – giant bean, oblique-seed jack-bean
Canavalia pubescens Hook. & Arn. – lavafield jack-bean
Canavalia raiateensis J.W. Moore
Canavalia ramosii J.D. Sauer
Canavalia regalis Piper & Dunn
Canavalia rockii H.St.John
Canavalia rosea (Sw.) DC. – bay bean, beach-bean, coastal jack-bean, fire-bean, Mackenzie-bean
Canavalia rutilans DC.
Canavalia sanguinea H.St.John
Canavalia saueri Fantz
Canavalia septentrionalis J.D. Sauer
Canavalia sericea A. Gray
Canavalia sericophylla Ducke
Canavalia stenophylla H.St.John
Canavalia villosa Benth.

Formerly placed here
Dysolobium grande (Wall. ex Benth.) Prain (as C. grandis (Wall. ex Benth.) Kurz)

Gallery

See also
 Thierry Bardini - researched Venezuelan jack-bean agriculture early in his career

References

External links
 International Plant Names Index: Canavalia taxa database.
 

 
Fabaceae genera
Phaseoleae
Taxa named by Michel Adanson